The SUCRE ("Unified System for Regional Compensation") was a  regional currency proposed for commercial exchanges between members of the regional trade bloc Bolivarian Alliance for the Americas (ALBA), which was created as an alternative to the Free Trade Agreement of the Americas (FTAA). The SUCRE was intended to replace the US dollar as a medium of exchange in order to decrease US influence and control of Latin American economies and to increase stability of regional markets.

The SUCRE was first used as a virtual currency in 2010 in two transactions between Ecuador and Venezuela. International trade between member states in SUCRE reached its maximum in 2012 with 2,646 transactions worth almost 1,066 million US dollars. In each following year trade in SUCRE shrank. In 2015 there were 752 transactions worth around 345 million dollars.

The plan for the introduction of the SUCRE, initially as a virtual currency, paralleled the European Union's introduction of the euro in 1999, which was preceded by the European Currency Unit in 1979. The SUCRE was intended as the unit of account for all transactions in a clearinghouse. Its value derived from a basket of currencies from the member countries, weighted according to the relative size of the economies.

The treaty explicitly limited the backing assets of the basket of currencies to financial securities denominated in the respective currencies of the member states. Prohibition of alternative forms of currency backing (such as commodity backing) presented an inequity for Ecuador that, alone in the group, does not have its own national currency (it uses the US dollar).

In the case of ALBA members Dominica, Saint Vincent and the Grenadines, and Antigua and Barbuda, the new currency posed a dilemma as they are already a member of the Eastern Caribbean Currency Union and use the East Caribbean dollar, although none of them had agreed to the treaty establishing the SUCRE and the regional payments clearinghouse.

The SUCRE is named after Antonio José de Sucre, a leading figure in Latin America's independence struggle. Agreement in general terms for the currency was declared in 2009. The formal treaty establishing the regional payments clearinghouse was signed by the six Latin American presidents in Cochabamba, Bolivia, on October 17, 2009. (The former currency of Ecuador, one of the SUCRE's users, was also called the sucre, but was abandoned and replaced by the US dollar after the economic crisis in 1999).

This currency has code XSU in ISO 4217 standard currency list.

In 2013 Uruguay joined the currency.

In 2018, the government of Venezuela proposed using the Petro, instead, for trade within ALBA.

See also 

Economic policy of the Hugo Chávez government
Fedwire
CHAPS
Clearing House Automated Transfer System (CHATS)
Currency Union
Eastern Caribbean dollar – A regional currency of the Eastern Caribbean
Hard bolívar
Petro

References

Real-time gross settlement
Interbank networks
Proposed currencies
Currency unions